Juan Kouyoumdjian is a naval architect.  He has designed ocean racing yachts, three of which have won the Volvo Ocean Race. He studied at the University of Southampton doing an Engineering Degree in ship science degree specializing in Yacht and Small Craft. During his studies, he did an internship with Philippe Briand in La Rochelle. On graduating in June 1993 he went on to work for Philippe Briand in La Rochelle for two years to work on the America's Cup Class boats, then he started his own business in 1996.

References 

Living people
Yacht designers
Argentine yacht designers
Year of birth missing (living people)
  
Alumni of the University of Southampton